A to Z is an American romantic comedy television series created by Ben Queen. He served as an executive producer with Rashida Jones and Will McCormack for Warner Bros. Television. The series debuted on October 2, 2014, on NBC. Viewership fell by nearly 50% by the fifth episode, which aired October 30, and NBC canceled the series the next day, though choosing to air the final eight episodes, which had already been produced. The series finale aired on January 22, 2015.

Premise
The story follows the lives of Andrew, an employee at an internet dating site who dreams of meeting the girl of his dreams, and Zelda, a no-nonsense lawyer who was raised by a hippie mother and carries a rebellious streak. By an accidental chance of fate, Zelda meets Andrew to resolve a mismatch dating dispute and these two single people suddenly find themselves falling for each other. From there, the series chronicles their relationship timeline "from A to Z", as narrated by Katey Sagal.

Cast

Main
 Ben Feldman as Andrew Lofland
 Cristin Milioti as Zelda Vasco
 Henry Zebrowski as Stu Bartokowski
 Lenora Crichlow as Stephie Bennett
 Christina Kirk as "Big Bird" Lydia
 Hong Chau as Lora
 Parvesh Cheena as Dinesh
 Katey Sagal as the narrator

Recurring
 Patrick Carlyle as Sage
 Ben Falcone as Howard
 Nancy Friedrich as Nancy

Broadcast
The series is available to stream in Australia on Stan. It broadcast on UK channel E4; it started on November 30, 2015. It began broadcasting on tv2 in New Zealand on December 6, 2015.

Episodes

Reception

Critical response
A to Z has received favorable reviews. Rotten Tomatoes gives the show a rating of 67% based on 48 reviews. The site's consensus states: "The leads are endearing, but A to Zs writing feels gimmicky and lacks a fresh perspective on the modern-day TV romance." Metacritic gives the show a score of 66 out of 100, based on reviews from 24 critics, indicating "generally favorable" reviews.

Ratings

References

External links
 
 

2014 American television series debuts
2015 American television series endings
2010s American romantic comedy television series
2010s American single-camera sitcoms
English-language television shows
NBC original programming
Nonlinear narrative television series
Television series about couples
Television series by Warner Bros. Television Studios
Television shows set in California